Woodrow is an unincorporated community in southern Lubbock County, Texas, United States. It lies on U.S. Route 87, ten miles south of Lubbock, and has an estimated population of 85. It is part of the Lubbock Metropolitan Statistical Area.

History
Established in the mid 1910s, Woodrow is one of the newest communities in Lubbock County. Upon its establishment, a bit of controversy arose over the new community's name. It was agreed to name it after President Woodrow Wilson, but there was argument over whether the name was to be "Woodrow" or "Wilson". The choice of Woodrow was finally settled on, possibly because there was already a Wilson in neighboring Lynn County.

The community's first school opened in 1917. As the twentieth century progressed the need arose to improve Lubbock County's rural schools, and as a result the Cooper School was built in Woodrow in 1936. Originally a combined elementary/middle/high school, the Cooper School evolved into the Lubbock-Cooper Independent School District which serves much of rural southern Lubbock County.

Education
Woodrow is served by the Lubbock-Cooper Independent School District.

See also
Llano Estacado
Caprock Escarpment
Slide, Texas

References

External links

Unincorporated communities in Lubbock County, Texas
Lubbock metropolitan area
Unincorporated communities in Texas
1910s establishments in Texas